Kleiv Simon Fiskvik (born 7 August 1943) is a Norwegian trade unionist president and politician.

Fiskvik was the leader of the Norwegian Confederation of Trade Unions in Norway's capital Oslo for many years, stepping down in 2009. He was formerly involved in the Norwegian Union of Municipal Employees.

Fiskvik is active in the Norwegian Labour Party. He was until 1997 a member of the Socialist Left Party, and was elected as a deputy representative to the Parliament of Norway from Oslo during the terms 1989–1993. He was also a member of Furuset borough council in the 1990s.

He is a cohabitant of fellow politician Inger Lise Husøy.

References

1943 births
Living people
Norwegian trade unionists
Deputy members of the Storting
Socialist Left Party (Norway) politicians
Labour Party (Norway) politicians
Politicians from Oslo